Liechtenstein competed at the 1964 Summer Olympics in Tokyo, Japan.

Results by event

Athletics
Men's Competition
 Alois Büchel
 Hugo Walser

References
Official Olympic Reports

Nations at the 1964 Summer Olympics
1964
1964 in Liechtenstein